Bezymyannaya is a rural locality (a village) in Nizhen-Vazhskoye Rural Settlement, Verkhovazhsky District, Vologda Oblast, Russia. The population was 111 as of 2002. Its name is Russian for "nameless" (feminine singular).

Geography 
Bezymyannaya is located on the right bank of the Sivchuga River, 17 km east of Verkhovazhye (the district's administrative centre) by road. Yalnichevskaya is the nearest rural locality.

References 

Rural localities in Verkhovazhsky District